Huzam Nabaah (born January 2, 1981) is an amateur boxer from Qatar who competed in the Light Heavyweight (-81 kg) division at the 2006 Asian Games winning the bronze medal in a lost bout against Korea's Sung Song Hak 15-29.

External links

References

1981 births
Living people
Qatari male boxers
Lightweight boxers
Asian Games medalists in boxing
Boxers at the 2006 Asian Games
Boxers at the 2010 Asian Games
Boxers at the 2014 Asian Games

Asian Games bronze medalists for Qatar
Medalists at the 2006 Asian Games